Sir Anton Dolin (27 July 190425 November 1983) was an English ballet dancer and choreographer.

Biography

Dolin was born in Slinfold in Sussex as Sydney Francis Patrick Chippendall Healey-Kay (generally known as Patrick or Pat Kay to his friends). He was the second of three sons of Henry George Kay (1852-1922) and his wife, Helen Maude Chippendall Healey (1869-1960), from Dublin. He trained at Serafina Astafieva's school at The Pheasantry in London's King's Road. He joined Sergei Diaghilev's Ballets Russes in 1921, was a principal there from 1924. It was Diaghilev who gave Patrick his stage name: at that time the most powerful impresario in world ballet, Diaghilev 'russified' names of his star dancers to keep up the tradition of his company.

In the 1930s, Dolin was a principal with the Vic-Wells Ballet. There he danced with Alicia Markova, with whom he went on to found the Markova-Dolin Ballet and the London Festival Ballet. In 1933, he spotted Vera Zorina and introduced her to Ballets Russes de Monte Carlo in 1934.

He joined Ballet Theatre when it was formed in 1940 and remained there as a dancer and choreographer until 1946.

Dolin wrote several books, including the autobiography Ballet Go Round (1938) and Alicia Markova: Her Life and Art (1953). 
He was knighted in 1981. He is featured in the documentary film A Portrait of Giselle.

He was the subject of This Is Your Life in April 1978 when he was surprised by Eamonn Andrews at London's Royal Academy of Dance.

Upon Dolin's death, dancers Jelko Yuresha and Belinda Wright inherited the rights to his choreography of Giselle, Pas de Quatre, and his acclaimed original ballet, Variations for Four. Yuresha and Wright danced—and later staged—productions of these ballets with dance companies around the world, designing original costumes and sets for those performances. In 2017, Yuresha (rights holder) and Philip Ronald Kay (Dolin's nephew and heir) founded the Sir Anton Dolin Foundation in Berlin, Germany with the aim of protecting Dolin's legacy. Since then, all rights to Dolin's works are the property of the Sir Anton Dolin Foundation.

Filmography

References

Sources

External links
 
National Library of Australia photographs
Images of Anton Dolin
Anton Dolin at Andros on Ballet

Columbia Encyclopedia entry
Concise Encyclopædia Britannica entry

The Anton Dolin Cuttings Books are held by the Victoria and Albert Museum Theatre and Performance Department.
Sir Anton Dolin Foundation

1904 births
1983 deaths
American Ballet Theatre dancers
Ballet choreographers
Ballets Russes dancers
Dancers of The Royal Ballet
English male ballet dancers
English choreographers
English National Ballet
Knights Bachelor
Rambert Dance Company dancers
English autobiographers
People from Slinfold